Chlothar III (or Chlotar, Clothar, Clotaire, Chlotochar, or Hlothar, giving rise to the name Lothair; 652–673) was the eldest son of Clovis II, king of Neustria and Burgundy, and his queen Balthild. When Clovis died in 657, Chlothar succeeded him under the regency of his mother. Only a month beforehand, according to the near-contemporary Life of Eligius by the courtier Audoin (bishop) of Rouen, Saint Eligius had prophesied the death of Clovis, Balthild's downfall, and Chlothar's short reign.

Few things are known about the time of Chlothar's reign. The Historia Langobardorum reports that in the early 660s a Frankish army invaded Provence and then Italy. This force came upon the camp of the Lombard king Grimoald I of Benevento, at Rivoli near Asta. Grimuald pretended to flee. The Franks looted the camp and celebrated. Then, after midnight, Grimuald attacked and drove them back to Neustria.

After the death of Saint Eligius in 661, the Life of Eligius records that a plague reduced the population of France's cities.  A plague in the British Isles, according to Bede, did the same there in 664.

During the regency, Austrasians requested a king of their own and, in 662, Chlothar's court sent another son of Clovis II, Childeric II, to be king there.

Also during his reign, the mayor of the palace Erchinoald died and a council of Franks elected Ebroin to replace him. Ebroin's early administrative authority was significant: Bede tells the story of how, in 668, the newly appointed Theodore of Canterbury could only travel through the Frankish kingdoms from Rome with the mayor's permission. Chlothar may have been more politically active after this time, as he reached the age of majority in 669. The nearest contemporary chronicle, the Liber Historiae Francorum of 727, relates only that he ruled for four years (presumably a reference to his active years 669-673) and then died. He is confirmed as still being in the sixteenth year of his reign in a chronological note in a Victorian Easter table of 673. His brother Theuderic III succeeded him as king later that same year.

It is notable that he is often described as the first roi fainéant—do-nothing king—of the Merovingian dynasty.

References

Sources

Further reading
 Fouracre, P., & R. Gerberding, Late Merovingian France: History and Hagiography 640-720 (Manchester, 1996).
 Geary, Patrick, Before France and Germany: The Creation and Transformation of the Merovingian World (Oxford, 1988).
 Gerberding, Richard, The Liber Historiae Francorum and the Rise of the Carolingians (Oxford, 1987).
 Wood, Ian, The Merovingian Kingdoms 450-751 (Harlow, 1994).

652 births
673 deaths
Frankish warriors
Merovingian kings
Medieval child monarchs
7th-century Frankish kings
Rois fainéants
Burials at the Basilica of Saint-Denis